Medicago radiata or ray-podded medick is a plant species of the genus Medicago. It is found throughout the eastern Mediterranean and in Asia. It forms a symbiotic relationship with the bacterium Sinorhizobium meliloti, which is capable of nitrogen fixation.

Gallery

External links 
 International Legume Database & Information Services

radiata
Plants described in 1753
Taxa named by Carl Linnaeus

Flora of Lebanon and Syria